is a private university in Gyōda, Saitama, Japan, established in 2001. The school name was proposed by philosopher Umehara Takeshi, who later became the president of the school.

External links
 Official website 

Educational institutions established in 2001
Private universities and colleges in Japan
Universities and colleges in Saitama Prefecture
Engineering universities and colleges in Japan
Gyōda
2001 establishments in Japan